Anyinam is a town and capital of the Atiwa East District located in the Eastern Region of Ghana.

Anyinam is the birthplace of Osei Tutu.  According to Gus Casely-Hayford, "Today Anyinam remains sacred to the Asante."  The village contains a shrine in commemoration of Osei Tutu's birth.

References

Populated places in the Eastern Region (Ghana)